The Even Stevens Movie is a 2003 American Disney Channel Original Movie that is based on the Disney Channel Original Series Even Stevens. It premiered on June 13, 2003, serving as the series finale. The movie drew an audience of 5.1 million viewers.

Plot
A mysterious man sorts through pictures of random families on a computer until he chooses the Stevens family. Meanwhile, Louis Stevens interrupts his older sister Ren's junior high graduation with a remote-controlled beachball meant to be full of confetti, unaware that his sidekick Beans has filled it with spaghetti, which spills on the school's gym teacher Coach Tugnut as the beachball explodes. The next day, Ren's aloof boyfriend Gil breaks up with her after taking a summer camp counselor job in Maine. She takes a job babysitting Beans get her mind off of him. After Ren and Louis get into a fight involving both the graduation and Louis' newest contraption (a modified lounge chair entitled the "Ultra Lounge-matic Super Chair") and accidentally hurt the mysterious man from the beginning, who introduces himself as Miles McDermott, he talks the Stevens family and Beans into going on a vacation, which is secretly the set of a new reality TV series called Family Fakeout. It is set on the fictional island of Mandelino, which in reality is Catalona, only a short distance off the California coast. Miles expresses resentment after he was fired from another, more popular reality show called Gotcha!.

The family is enthusiastically welcomed by a large ensemble of actors portraying island natives, but Louis accidentally destroys the sacred palace the family was meant to spend their vacation in, making the "natives" shun them. The family separates into two groups pitted against each other. Both groups encounter various situations, such as starvation and a "killer squirrel." Ren seeks solace with Jason, an actor playing the native "Mootai", who is supposed to romance Ren to boost ratings. However, he is genuinely interested in her and can't bring himself to break up with her when he is scripted to do so. Just before he tells the truth, the "native" actors improvise and kidnap Jason and claim Louis sold them out, leaving Ren vengeful.

Louis' best friend Twitty and girlfriend Tawny come to the island to rescue them. Twitty expresses regret for notifying Miles and setting the Stevens family up. He is caught by the show's staff but escapes and shuts down the equipment monitoring the Stevens groups. Louis and Ren's older brother Donnie finds Tawny, and the reunited family learns the truth. They join Twitty and Tawny to stop Ren from killing Louis. Ren corners him on a cliff, and despite the protests of the family and Miles, who tells her the truth, she pushes Louis off to his apparent death, much to the viewers' and Miles' horror. As Miles breaks down in guilt, a helicopter appears with Louis safely in tow and Lance LeBow, the host of Gotcha!. The Stevens family had planned this charade to get back at Miles. Lance informs Miles that he is no longer a host of his own show because of his torments. After sharing a laugh, the family chases Miles away.

Louis tells Ren that, though he loves playing pranks on her, he would never do anything to hurt her. He then suggests she start a relationship with Jason back on the mainland. Jason apologizes to Ren for stringing her along and confesses that his feelings for her were real. After the family returns home, Beans narrates the epilogue: Donnie has started college, Mr. Stevens has received a major job offer, Louis and Tawny have spent their summer lounging on Louis' modified lounge chair (which needs more improvements), and Ren and Jason have become an official couple. Beans then disrupts a Stevens family dinner, leading to Ren and Louis argue about who let Beans in the house. The film ends with The Twitty-Stevens Connection singing "Dream Vacation" to clips from the film and some outtakes.

Cast
 Shia LaBeouf as Louis Stevens
 Christy Carlson Romano as Ren Stevens
 Donna Pescow as Eileen Stevens
 Tom Virtue as Steve Stevens
 Nick Spano as Donnie Stevens
 Steven Anthony Lawrence as Bernard "Beans" Aranguren, Louis's young sidekick
 Tim Meadows as Miles McDermott, the host of Family Fakeout
 A.J. Trauth as Alan Twitty, Louis's best friend
 Margo Harshman as Tawny Dean, Louis's girlfriend
 Fred Meyers as Tom Gribalski, Louis's intelligent friend
 Dave Coulier as Lance LeBow, the host of Gotcha
 Keone Young as "Chief Tuka", an actor who portrays an island native leader
 Lauren Frost as Ruby Mendel, one of Ren's friends
 Kenya Williams as Monique Taylor, one of Ren's friends
 Jim Wise as Coach Tugnut, Lawrence Junior High School's gym teacher
 Eric “Ty” Hodges as Larry Beale, Ren's rival classmate
 Walker Howard as "Laylo" / Patrick Green, an actor who portrays an island native and Donnie's former classmate
 Josh Keaton as "Mootai" / Jason Holdstead, an actor who portrays an island native
 Kyle Gibson as Gil
 George Anthony Bell as Principal Conrad Wexler, the head of Lawrence Junior High
 Toni Dugan as Keith
 Matthew Yang King as Scott
 Daniele O’Loughlin as Brooke
 Jody Howard as Cynthia Mills

Reception
The Even Stevens Movie was the most-watched cable program on June 13, 2003, including dominating among children ages 6–11 and tweens 9–14, and drawing 5.1 million total viewers.

Home media
The Even Stevens Movie was released on DVD and VHS on June 28, 2005 in Region 1 countries.

The film is available for purchase on iTunes store in non-cropped Widescreen.

As of November 12, 2019, the film, along with the series, are available to stream on Disney+

See also
 List of American films of 2003

References

External links

 

2003 television films
2003 films
American adventure comedy films
Disney Channel Original Movie films
Reality television series parodies
American television series finales
Brookwell McNamara Entertainment films
Films set in California
Films set on islands
American television films
Films about vacationing
Films shot in Hawaii
Television films based on television series
Films about television
Films directed by Sean McNamara
Films scored by Mark Mothersbaugh
2000s American films